Rinaldo Simen (8 March 1849 – 20 September 1910) was a Swiss politician and President of the Swiss Council of States (1899).

Piazza Rinaldo Simen in Bellinzona and Via Rinaldo Simen in Minusio, Locarno and Lugano are named for him.

External links 
 
 

1849 births
1910 deaths
Members of the Council of States (Switzerland)
Presidents of the Council of States (Switzerland)